Alex Sanders may refer to:

Alex Sanders (Wiccan) (1926–1988), high priest of the neopagan religion of Wicca
Alex Sanders (actor) (born 1966), American pornographic actor
Alex Sanders (politician) (born 1939), American politician from South Carolina